Mark Steiner (May 6, 1942 – April 6, 2020) was an American-born Israeli professor of philosophy. He taught philosophy of mathematics and physics at the Hebrew University of Jerusalem. Steiner died after contracting COVID-19 during the COVID-19 pandemic.

Biography
Mark Steiner was born in the Bronx, New York. He graduated from Columbia University in 1965 and studied at the University of Oxford as a Fulbright Fellow. He then received his Ph.D. in philosophy from Princeton University in 1972 after completing a doctoral dissertation titled "On mathematical knowledge."  Steiner taught at Columbia from 1970 to 1977.

Steiner died on April 6, 2020, in Shaare Zedek Medical Center, after contracting the COVID-19 virus during the COVID-19 pandemic in Israel.

Academic career
Steiner is best known for his book The Applicability of Mathematics as a Philosophical Problem, in which he attempted to explain the historical utility of mathematics in physics. The book may be considered an extended meditation on the issues raised by Eugene Wigner's article "The Unreasonable Effectiveness of Mathematics in the Natural Sciences". Steiner is also the author of the book Mathematical Knowledge.

Steiner also translated Reuven Agushewitz's philosophical work Emune un Apikorses from Yiddish.

References

External links 
Faculty address page 

1942 births
2020 deaths
Writers from the Bronx
American emigrants to Israel
Israeli people of American-Jewish descent
Jewish American academics
Jewish philosophers
Philosophers of mathematics
Deaths from the COVID-19 pandemic in Israel
Academic staff of the Hebrew University of Jerusalem
Princeton University alumni
20th-century Israeli philosophers
21st-century Israeli philosophers
Columbia College (New York) alumni
Columbia University faculty